Avonlea (av-on-LEE) is a fictional community located on Prince Edward Island, Canada, and is the setting of Lucy Maud Montgomery's novel Anne of Green Gables, following the adventures of Anne Shirley, as well as its sequels, and the television series Road to Avonlea.

Montgomery drew much of her inspiration for Avonlea from her childhood experiences in the late 19th century farming communities surrounding Cavendish, New Glasgow, New London, Hunter River, and Park Corner.

In Montgomery's works, Avonlea is located on the northern shore of Prince Edward Island on a small peninsula. Its primary industries are farming and lobster fishing.  Neighbouring fictional communities include Carmody, White Sands (not to be confused with the modern White Sands, which is on the southern edge of PEI), Grafton, Bright River, Newbridge, and Spencervale.

Further reading
 Making Avonlea: L.M. Montgomery and Popular Culture, edited by Irene Gammel (University of Toronto Press, 2002)

References

External links
Rough map of Avonlea
Rough map of the region around Avonlea

Fictional populated places in Canada
Anne of Green Gables